LeParis Dade, known professionally as OMB Peezy, is an American rapper based in Sacramento, California. He is originally from Mobile, Alabama.

Background and career
OMB Peezy was born to a musical family in Mobile, Alabama and later raised in Sacramento, California.

In 2016, he released the song "Lay Down" and its accompanying music video. In early 2017, he signed to Sick Wid It Records and later 300 Entertainment. He released "When I Was Down" in May 2017.

Peezy also featured in Nef the Pharaoh's song, "Move 4", with Jay Ant, released in 2017. In June 2017, he released the single "Porch." The single "Try Sumthin" featuring Yhung To was released in July 2017. He released the EP Humble Beginnings on October 11, 2017. In July 2018, he released the single "Yeah Yeah" featuring TK Kravitz. The mixtape Loyalty Over Love was released on August 10, 2018. In April 2019, he released the album Preacher to the Streets. In April 2020, he released the single "Everybody". On May 15, he released the mixtape In the Meantime. In November 2020, he featured on The Hunna's remix of "Lost".

Legal issues
In March 2021, Peezy was charged with aggravated assault with a deadly weapon and possession of a firearm after allegedly shooting at Roddy Ricch and 42 Dugg while filming a music video on set.

Discography

Studio albums

Extended plays

Compilation Albums

Mixtapes

Singles

References

External links
 Official website

Living people
Musicians from Alabama
Musicians from Mobile, Alabama
Rappers from Alabama
Rappers from Sacramento, California
Musicians from Sacramento, California
1997 births
21st-century American rappers